First-seeded Molla Mallory defeated Helen Wills 6–3, 6–1 in the final to win the women's singles tennis title at the 1922 U.S. National Championships. The event was held at the West Side Tennis Club, Forest Hills, New York City. It was Mallory's seventh U.S. National singles title.

Draw

Final eight

References

1922
1922 in women's tennis
1922 in American women's sports
Women's Singles
1920s in New York City
1922 in sports in New York (state)
Women's sports in New York (state)
Women in New York City